Dölf Reist (1921-2000) was a Swiss mountaineer, best known for the third successful summit of Mount Everest on 23 May 1956, as part of the 1956 Swiss Expedition to Everest and Lhotse.

Reist and Ernst Reiss are said to have formed "one of the best leaderless rope teams in Switzerland".

Reist was part of the second two-man team to reach the Summit, and he climbed with Hans Ruedi von Gunten.

See also
List of 20th-century summiters of Mount Everest

References

External links
Gallery of Swiss Everest expedition as photographed by little Dölf Reist (swissinfo.ch)

1921 births
2000 deaths
Swiss mountain climbers